The Tille is an  river of eastern France (département Côte-d'Or), a right tributary of the Saône. It is formed by the confluence of three small streams near Cussey-les-Forges, on the Plateau of Langres. The Tille flows south through the following towns: Til-Châtel, Arc-sur-Tille (east of Dijon) and Genlis.

In 2022, the river dried up following severe drought conditions.

References

Rivers of France
Rivers of Côte-d'Or
Rivers of Bourgogne-Franche-Comté